Michael ("Magic Mikey P") Paul (born 28 March 1957 in Malabar, Arima) is a retired athlete from Trinidad and Tobago who specialized in the 400 metres and 4 x 400 metres relay.

Achievements

References
Best of Trinidad
Profile

1957 births
Living people
Trinidad and Tobago male sprinters
Athletes (track and field) at the 1984 Summer Olympics
Olympic athletes of Trinidad and Tobago
Athletes (track and field) at the 1978 Commonwealth Games
Athletes (track and field) at the 1979 Pan American Games
Commonwealth Games competitors for Trinidad and Tobago
Pan American Games competitors for Trinidad and Tobago
People from Arima
Central American and Caribbean Games silver medalists for Trinidad and Tobago
Competitors at the 1978 Central American and Caribbean Games
Competitors at the 1986 Central American and Caribbean Games
Central American and Caribbean Games medalists in athletics